
Gmina Dubiecko is a rural gmina (administrative district) in Przemyśl County, Subcarpathian Voivodeship, in south-eastern Poland.

The gmina contains part of the protected area called Pogórze Przemyskie Landscape Park.

Villages
Gmina Dubiecko contains the villages and settlements of Bachórzec, Drohobyczka, Dubiecko, Hucisko Nienadowskie, Iskań, Kosztowa, Łączki, Nienadowa, Piątkowa, Przedmieście Dubieckie, Sielnica, Śliwnica, Słonne, Tarnawka, Winne-Podbukowina, Wybrzeże and Załazek Piątkowski.

Neighbouring gminas
Gmina Dubiecko is bordered by the gminas of Bircza, Dynów, Jawornik Polski, Kańczuga, Krzywcza and Pruchnik.

References

Polish official population figures 2006

Dubiecko
Przemyśl County